David Gregg may refer to:

 David Gregg (minister) (1846–1919), American minister and author
 David L. Gregg (1819–1868), American diplomat and politician
 David McMurtrie Gregg (1833–1916), farmer, diplomat and Union cavalry general in the American Civil War
 David Paul Gregg (1923–2001), inventor of the optical disc
 David Gregg (1767-1828), great-grandfather of president Harry S. Truman